Denise Thiémard (born 24 March 1960 in Orsonnens) is a retired Swiss javelin thrower. Her personal best throw was 64.04 metres with the old javelin type, achieved in July 1987 in Oslo.

She finished twelfth at the 1986 European Championships and ninth at the 1988 Olympic Games. She became Swiss champion in 1983 and the years 1985-1992.

Achievements

References

Living people
1960 births
Swiss female javelin throwers
Athletes (track and field) at the 1988 Summer Olympics
Olympic athletes of Switzerland
Sportspeople from the canton of Fribourg